Dialogue is defined as “any negotiated exchange of ideas and opinions”. Public relations can facilitate dialogue by establishing channels and procedures for dialogic communication. Dialogic theory argues that organizations should be willing to interact with publics in honest and ethical ways in order to create effective organization-public communication channels.

Historical development 
The concept of dialogue has its roots in various disciplines such as philosophy, rhetoric, psychology, and relational communication. Philosophers and rhetoricians have long perceived dialogue as one of the most ethical forms of communication and as one of the central means of separating truth from falsehood. Theologian Martin Buber was considered as the father of the modern concept of dialogue. In public relations, dialogue was explained as “communicating about issues with publics”. There has been a theoretical shift from public relations reflecting an emphasis on managing communication to an emphasis on communication as a tool for establishing relationships. 

The consideration of dialogue as a public relations theory should be attributed to Pearson. According to Pearson (1989), public relations can be conceptualized as the management of interpersonal dialectic. After that, Botan claimed that “dialogue manifests itself more as a stance, orientation, or bearing in communication rather than as a specific method, technique, or format (p. 192).”  Kent and Taylor argued that “dialogue is product rather than process” (p. 323) and viewed the symmetrical model as a procedural way to listen or solicit feedback. Furthermore, clarified the concept of dialogue in public relations and proposed principles of dialogic theory.

Key concepts

Features 
Dialogue as an orientation has five features: 

Mutuality, or the recognition of organization-public relationship. Without the publics, organizations have no purpose. Seeking collaboration through the publics through dialogue will contribute towards successful relationship building.
 Propinquity, or the temporality and spontaneity of interactions with the public.  By even asking the publics for their input before the decision making process could be beneficial depending on the organization/activity/idea. The utilization of a dialogic loop online is a way for the public's voices to be heard. As well as, making the organization present to its publics.
 Empathy, or the supportiveness and confirmation of public goals and interests. Support is extremely important. Being able to collaborate to maintain a communal mindset is essential. The idea of a communal mindset shows the importance in building the community, not solely the organization.
 Risk, or the intention to communicate with publics on their own terms. The amount of information shared or the type of information shared with another organization or publics leads to vulnerability and unexpected consequences. 
 Commitment, or the degree to which an organization gives itself over to dialogue, interpretation, and understanding in its interactions with publics. Even if someone does not agree with the views of another, one must acknowledge the view as valid and try to find middle ground.

Principles 
Kent and Taylor proposed five dialogic principles which could guide organizations to establish dialogic relationships with publics on websites. 

 Dialogic loop
A dialogic loop allows publics to query organizations and provides organizations with the opportunity to respond to questions, concerns, and problems.
 Usefulness of Information
Websites should make efforts to post information of general value to all publics. 
 Generation of Return Visits
Websites should include features that make them attractive for repeat visits such as updated information, changing issues, and special forums. 
 The Intuitiveness / Ease of Interface
Websites ought to provide conveniences for visitors to figure out and understand. Tables of contents are useful and should be well organized and hierarchical. 
 Conservation of Visitors
Websites should contain only essential links with clearly marked paths for visitors to return to the sites.

Extension 
The dialogic theory has been extended to explain how various organizations build dialogic relationships with publics through websites. blogs and social media such as Facebook and Twitter. For instance, Esrock and Leichty studied the dialogic capacity of organizational Web sites and found that only a minority of Fortune 500 organizations employed Kent and Taylor's principles of dialogic communication. Another study examined how environmental advocacy organizations employed dialogic strategies on their Facebook profiles and found that using dialogic strategies led to greater dialogic engagement between organizations and visitors.

References 
 Bortree, D. S., & Seltzer, T. (2009). Dialogic strategies and outcomes: An analysis of environmental advocacy groups’ Facebook profiles. Public Relations Review, 35(3), 317-319.
 Botan, C. (1992). International public relations: Critique and reformulation. Public Relations Review, 18(2), 149-159.
 Botan, C. (1997). Ethics in strategic communication campaigns: The case for a new approach to public relations. Journal of Business Communication, 34(2), 188-202.
 Esrock, S. L., & Leichty, G. B. (1999). Corporate World Wide Web pages: Serving the news media and other publics. Journalism & Mass Communication Quarterly, 76(3), 456-467.
 Grunig, J. E., & Hunt, T. (1984). Managing public relations. Fort Worth, TX: Holt, Rinehart and Winston.
 Kent, M. L., & Taylor, M. (1998). Building dialogic relationships through the World Wide Web. Public Relations Review, 24(3), 321-334.
 Kent, M. L., & Taylor, M. (2002). Toward a dialogic theory of public relations. Public Relations Review, 28(1), 21-37.
 Kent, M. L., Taylor, M., & White, W. J. (2003). The relationship between Web site design and organizational responsiveness to stakeholders. Public Relations Review, 29(1), 63-77.
 Pearson, R. (1989). A theory of public relations ethics. Unpublished doctoral dissertation, Ohio University. 
 Rybalko, S., & Seltzer, T. (2010). Dialogic communication in 140 characters or less: How Fortune 500 companies engage stakeholders using Twitter. Public Relations Review, 36(4), 336-341.
 Seltzer, T., & Mitrook, M. (2007). The dialogic potential of weblogs in relationships building. Public Relations Review, 33(2), 227-229.
 Sweetser, K. D., & Lariscy, R. W. (2008). Candidates make good friends: An analysis if candidates’ uses of Facebook. International Journal of Strategic Communication, 2(3), 175-198.
 Taylor, M., Kent, M. L., & White, W. J. (2001). How activist organizations are using the Internet to build relationships. Public Relations Review, 27(3), 263-284.

Public relations